The 1961 Oregon State Beavers football team represented Oregon State University in the 1961 NCAA University Division football season. Led by seventh-year head coach Tommy Prothro, the Beavers ended their third season as an independent with five wins and five losses, and outscored their opponents 198 to 192. Four home games were played on campus at Parker Stadium in Corvallis with one at Multnomah Stadium in Portland.

Prior to this season, the university's current title, Oregon State University, was adopted by a legislative act signed into law by Governor Mark Hatfield on March 6, 1961, and became effective in the summer.

Schedule

Roster
QB Terry Baker, Jr.
  E   Don Kasso, Sr.
  T   Mike Kline, Sr.
HB Hank Rivera, Sr.
HB Leroy Whittle, So.
FB Bruce Williams, So.

Professional football drafts

NFL Draft

AFL Draft

References

External links
 WSU Libraries: Game video – Washington State at Oregon State – November 4, 1961

Oregon State
Oregon State Beavers football seasons
Oregon State Beavers football